Herpetopoma seychellarum is a species of sea snail, a marine gastropod mollusk in the family Chilodontidae.

Description
The height of the shell attains 3 mm.
The small, white, rather solid, subglobose shell has a depressed-conical shape. The four whorls are a little convex. They are joined by an impressed suture, and ornamented by spiral closely, minutely granulose riblets; The body whorl is rounded at the periphery. The base of the shell is convex, spirally granulate-ribbed, and narrowly umbilicate. The aperture is subrotund. The outer lip is regularly arched, its edge rather
obtuse, and sulcate inside. The columella is straight, obliquely sloping, with a small tooth below.

Distribution
This species occurs in the Indian Ocean off the Seychelles.

References

External links
 To World Register of Marine Species
 

seychellarum
Gastropods described in 1869